The superior vestibular nucleus (Bechterew's nucleus) is the dorso-lateral part of the vestibular nucleus and receives collaterals and terminals from the ascending branches of the vestibular nerve.

Sends uncrossed fibers to cranial nerve 3 and 4 via the medial longitudinal fasciculus (MLF)

References

Cranial nerve nuclei